The 2020–21 Alcorn State Braves basketball team represented Alcorn State University in the 2020–21 NCAA Division I men's basketball season. The Braves, led by first-year head coach Landon Bussie, played their home games at the Davey Whitney Complex in Lorman, Mississippi as members of the Southwestern Athletic Conference.

Previous season
The Braves finished the 2019–20 season 15–15, 11–7 in SWAC play to finish in a three-way tie for fourth place. They lost in the first round of the SWAC tournament to Jackson State.

On March 23, it was announced that head coach Montez Robinson's contract would not be renewed, ending his 5-year tenure with the team. A month later, on April 23, it was announced that Prairie View A&M assistant coach Landon Bussie would be the Braves' next head coach.

Roster

Schedule and results 

|-
!colspan=12 style=| Non-conference regular season

|-
!colspan=9 style=| SWAC regular season

|-
!colspan=12 style=| SWAC tournament
|-

|-

Sources

References

Alcorn State Braves basketball seasons
Alcorn State Braves
Alcorn State Braves basketball
Alcorn State Braves basketball